Yam Ah Mee (born 2 July 1957) is a Singaporean former brigadier-general and civil servant who served as Chief Executive Director of the People's Association between 2010 and 2013. He was also known for his monotone voice and expressionless demeanour as the returning officer for the 2011 general election.

Biography
Yam was educated at Hwa Chong Junior College, before graduating from the University of New South Wales with a first class honours degree in engineering. He graduated from the Royal Military College, Duntroon in Australia, with The Queens Medal in 1980, under a scholarship conferred by the Singapore Armed Forces (SAF). He also completed a Master of Business Administration degree at the National University of Singapore and a Master of Public Administration degree at Harvard University.

Yam had served in the Republic of Singapore Air Force (RSAF), rising to the position of Chief of Staff – Air Staff, commanding the ground-based, air-defence systems, which include the new Igla short range surface to air missiles, before retiring with the rank Brigadier-General, and entering the Civil Service.

He joined the Public Service Division in August 1998 and was appointed the Deputy Secretary (Development), and CEO and Dean of the Civil Service College. He was then posted to the Ministry of Transport (MOT) as Deputy Secretary (Sea and Air) on 1 June 2004 and was appointed Chief Executive of Land Transport Authority on 11 May 2005. He was also President of the Singapore Youth Flying Club for 8 years from 1998 to 2006. In 2008, Yam was awarded the Pingat Pentadbiran Awam (Emas) (Public Administration Medal (Gold)).

On 1 May 2010, Yam was appointed Chief Executive Director-designate of the People's Association, and on 1 June 2010 fully assumed the position of Chief Executive Director, taking over from the retiring Tan Boon Huat. His appointment as Returning Officer for the 2011 general election also took effect on 1 June 2010.

Returning Officer
Yam shot to fame during the 2011 general election results release, as Returning Officer—having replaced Tan Boon Huat who retired. He was noted for his monotoned "nasal" voice and expressionless demeanour while reading out the 26 batches of results. Fan pages were soon created on Facebook while the results release was still ongoing. Netizens have also released music videos with clips and remixes of his voice on YouTube. A video of Yam doing the chicken dance with youths from Geylang Serai Community Club also went viral, before it was quickly taken down.

Yam has since explained that his "robotic" and "nasal" voice is due to an operation he had, to remove a fishbone in his larynx, although he has also said, explaining his impassive delivery to The Straits Times, that he "felt it was important to announce [the election results] clearly, concisely and impartially."

Yam was appointed by Prime Minister Lee Hsien Loong as Returning Officer for the 2011 presidential election. Yam announced the results of the 4 nominated candidates for the presidential election at 4:24am (GMT +8).

Yam was named as Returning Officer for the 2012 Hougang by-election.

The 2013 Punggol East by-election was Yam's last appearance as Returning Officer.

Post-elections

After the 2011 general election
Yam's robotic voice announcing the results for Aljunied GRC had turned into a mix just within a few hours ensuing the elections. Many have taken clips of his voice and mixed it with various styles of music, from electro to dance, on YouTube.

Within two days, Yam's Facebook account had reached the 5000 friends limit. Yam thus created an official page for himself; although non-official pages had already appeared by then.

After a week, he did a "spoof" video of himself, in which he announced PAssion Movie Night, held to celebrate a million PAssion Card memberships, in his trademark manner.

Yam filmed a video in late May, to promote a K-pop dance event on 29 May 2011, to be held at Ngee Ann City.

In less than 24 hours after the release of the 2011 presidential election results, a club mix of Yam announcing the results was released on YouTube, by the same user responsible for the earlier club mix of Yam's general elections "performance".

Yam starred in a musical held to celebrate the opening of the first 12 stations of the Circle Line, on 2 October.

People's Association
As part of an effort to promote the PA and social cohesion, Yam made appearances at many youth and sporting events, particularly after his rise to fame in the elections.

In January 2013, reports emerged that Yam had resigned from the PA and would leave the organisation by March, to be replaced by Ang Hak Seng, former Chief Executive for the Health Promotion Board. In an interview with RazorTV, he announced plans to pursue a career in the private sector after 36 years in the Civil Service. He held a farewell party on 28 March 2013 and ended his tenure at the PA on 31 March 2013.

Sembcorp
Yam joined Sembcorp Design and Construction as its managing director on 16 April 2013.

Personal life
Yam has a son, Gabriel, who is a pilot trainee in the Republic of Singapore Air Force (RSAF), as of 2008.

References

Works cited 

1957 births
Living people
Singaporean people of Chinese descent
Singaporean civil servants
Hwa Chong Junior College alumni
Harvard Kennedy School alumni
National University of Singapore alumni
University of New South Wales alumni
Royal Military College, Duntroon graduates